The 2015 Badminton Asia Championships was the 34th edition of the Badminton Asia Championships. It was held in Wuhan, China, from April 21 to April 26.

Venue
Wuhan Sports Center Gymnasium

Medalists

Medal table

Men's singles

Seeds

  Chen Long (Semi final)
  Lin Dan (champion)
  Srikanth Kidambi (withdrew)
  Son Wan-ho (quarter-final)
  Chou Tien-chen (quarter-final)
  Tommy Sugiarto (withdrew)
  Wang Zhengming (Semi final)
  Sho Sasaki (quarter-final)

Finals

Top half

Section 1

Section 2

Bottom half

Section 3

Section 4

Women's singles

Seeds

  Li Xuerui (final)
  Saina Nehwal (quarter-final)
  Wang Shixian (third round)
  Sung Ji-hyun (quarter-final)
  Tai Tzu-ying (Semi final)
  Wang Yihan (Semi final)
  Ratchanok Intanon (champion)
  Pusarla Venkata Sindhu (quarter-final)

Finals

Top half

Section 1

Section 2

Bottom half

Section 3

Section 4

Men's doubles

Seeds

  Lee Yong-dae / Yoo Yeon-seong (champion)
  Lee Sheng-mu / Tsai Chia-hsin (second round)
  Liu Xiaolong / Qiu Zihan (quarter-final)
  Hiroyuki Endo / Kenichi Hayakawa (quarter-final)
  Ko Sung-hyun / Shin Baek-cheol (withdrew)
  Muhammad Ahsan / Hendra Setiawan (final)
  Chai Biao / Hong Wei (quarter-final)
  Fu Haifeng / Zhang Nan (third round)

Finals

Top half

Section 1

Section 2

Bottom half

Section 3

Section 4

Women's doubles

Seeds

  Misaki Matsutomo / Ayaka Takahashi (Semi final)
  Luo Ying / Luo Yu (Semi final)
  Reika Kakiiwa / Miyuki Maeda (second round)
  Wang Xiaoli / Yu Yang (final)

Finals

Top half

Section 1

Section 2

Bottom half

Section 3

Section 4

Mixed doubles

Seeds

Finals

Top half

Section 1

Section 2

Bottom half

Section 3

Section 4

References

External links
Badminton Asia Championships 2015

Badminton Asia Championships
Asian Badminton Championships
Badminton tournaments in China
International sports competitions hosted by China
2015 in Chinese sport
Sport in Wuhan
April 2015 sports events in China